Chol may refer to:
 Chol (Bible), a Hebrew term used in the Bible
 Chol, Iran
 Col language

See also
 Ch'ol (disambiguation)